Live at the Musicians Exchange Cafe (also released as What's New?, The Real McCoy, and Hip Toe) is a live album by McCoy Tyner released on the Who's Who in Jazz label. It was recorded in July 1987 and features performances by Tyner with Avery Sharpe and Louis Hayes.

Reception 
The Allmusic review by Ken Dryden states that "This 1987 live date from a Fort Lauderdale club is worth seeking".

Track listing 
 "Señor Carlos" - 9:13
 "Lover Man" (Davis, Ramirez, Sherman) - 8:59
 "You Taught My Heart to Sing" (Cahn, Tyner) - 6:20
 "Port au Blues" - 7:45
 "Island Birdie" - 13:02
 "What's New?" (Burke, Haggart) - 5:26
 "Hip Toe" - 9:27
All compositions by McCoy Tyner except as indicated
Recorded at the Musicians Exchange Cafe, Fort Lauderdale on July 24 & 25, 1987.

Personnel 
 McCoy Tyner: piano
 Avery Sharpe: bass
 Louis Hayes: drums

References 

1988 live albums
McCoy Tyner live albums